Colin William Wright (10 October 1867 – 14 December 1952) was an Australian cattle breeder, grazier, local government councillor and local government head. Wright was born in Oxley, Brisbane, Queensland and died in Rockhampton, Queensland.

See also

 Ralph Bodkin Kelley
 James Lockie Wilson
 Frank William Bulcock

References

Queensland local councillors
Australian people of English descent
Australian people of Scottish descent
1867 births
1952 deaths
Australian farmers